The Pastos Bons Formation is a Late Jurassic (Oxfordian to Kimmeridgian) geologic formation of the Parnaíba Basin in Maranhão, northeastern Brazil. The formation forms part of the sag phase of the basin. It overlies the Sardinha Formation and is overlain by the Mosquito Formation. The fluvial to lacustrine sandstones and shales have provided fossils of a coelacanth fish, Parnaibaia maranhaoensis and a paralligatorid named after the formation, Batrachomimus pastosbonensis.

Fossil content 
The following fossils were reported from the formation:
 Reptiles
 Batrachomimus pastosbonensis
 Fish
 Parnaibaia maranhaoensis

See also 
 Takutu Formation, contemporaneous formation of northern Brazil and Guyana

References

Bibliography 

 
 
 

Geologic formations of Brazil
Jurassic System of South America
Jurassic Brazil
Kimmeridgian Stage
Oxfordian Stage
Sandstone formations
Shale formations
Fluvial deposits
Lacustrine deposits
Paleontology in Brazil
Formations
Northeast Region, Brazil